Mark Ware Isham (born September 7, 1951) is an American musician and film composer. A trumpeter and keyboardist, Isham works in a variety of genres, including jazz and electronic. He is also a film composer, having worked on numerous films and television series, including The Hitcher, Point Break, A River Runs Through It, Of Mice and Men, Warrior, Nell, Blade, Crash, The Black Dahlia, The Lucky One and Once Upon a Time.

Isham acted as well in Made in Heaven by Alan Rudolph (1987) and directed  The Cowboy and the Ballerina in 1998.

Life and career

Isham was born in New York City, the son of Patricia (née Hammond), a violinist, and Howard Fuller Isham, a professor of humanities.

His discography is extensive and varied, including participation with artists including David Sylvian, Group 87, Art Lande, Pharoah Sanders, Van Morrison, David Torn, and sessions with people like Brian Wilson, Joni Mitchell, Terry Bozzio, Bill Bruford, XTC, and Siouxsie Sioux. His musical styles include crossover jazz, post-bop, ambient, progressive electronic, chamber jazz, and new age.

Isham is a Scientologist. He is married to Donna Isham.

Discography

Studio albums and compilations
1983 Vapor Drawings
1985 Film Music
1987 We Begin (with Art Lande)
1988 Castalia
1989 Tibet – a soundtrack
1990 Mark Isham
1991 Songs My Children Taught Me 
1995 Blue Sun
1998 Mark Isham: A Windham Hill Retrospective
1999 Miles Remembered: The Silent Way Project
2009 Bittersweet with Kate Ceberano
2015 The Longest Ride (Original Score Album).

Rabbit Ears Storybook Classics
1987 The Steadfast Tin Soldier (Narrated by Jeremy Irons)
1988 The Emperor and the Nightingale (Narrated by Glenn Close)
1989 Thumbelina (Narrated by Kelly McGillis)
1990 The Emperor's New Clothes (Narrated by John Gielgud)
1992 The Boy Who Drew Cats (Narrated by William Hurt)
1994 The Firebird (Narrated by Susan Sarandon)

Other
2000 Hymn of Asia: L. Ron Hubbard (Instrument Orchestration and Choral Arrangements)
2006 Theme to the United States Army's Army Strong campaign
2007 Human the Death Dance by Sage Francis (Production on "Good Fashion" and "Water Line")
2009 Dallas et Kate with Kate Ceberano

As member
With Group 87
Group 87 (Columbia Records, 1980)
A Career in Dada Processing (Capitol Records, 1984)

As sideman
With Art Lande
 Rubisa Patrol (ECM, 1976)
 Desert Marauders (ECM 1978)
With Pharoah Sanders
Journey to the One (Theresa, 1980)
With Van Morrison
Into the Music (Mercury, 1979)
Common One (Mercury, 1980)
Beautiful Vision (Mercury, 1982)
Inarticulate Speech of the Heart (Mercury, 1983)
Live at the Grand Opera House Belfast  (Mercury, 1984)
With David Sylvian
Brilliant Trees (Virgin, 1984)
Secrets of the Beehive (Virgin, 1987)
With David Torn
 Cloud About Mercury (ECM, 1987)
With Andy Summers
 Charming Snakes (Private Music, 1990)

Contributions to soundtracks

Films

Television series

Documentaries and shorts

Filmography 
As director

As screenwriter

As actor

See also 
List of ambient music artists

References

External links
 
 YouTube channel
 Artist Biography by Steve Huey at Allmusic.com
 

1951 births
Living people
American electronic musicians
American film score composers
American jazz composers
American jazz trumpeters
American male film score composers
American male jazz composers
American male trumpeters
American Scientologists
American television composers
Chamber jazz trumpeters
Composers from New York City
ECM Records artists
Electronic composers
Emmy Award winners
Grammy Award winners
Jazz musicians from New York (state)
La-La Land Records artists
Male television composers
Musicians from New York City
New-age synthesizer players
Post-bop trumpeters
Varèse Sarabande Records artists
Windham Hill Records artists